Simone Pinzani (born 11 April 1972) is an Italian skier. He competed in the Nordic combined event at the 1994 Winter Olympics.

References

External links
 

1972 births
Living people
Italian male Nordic combined skiers
Olympic Nordic combined skiers of Italy
Nordic combined skiers at the 1994 Winter Olympics
People from Cividale del Friuli
Sportspeople from Friuli-Venezia Giulia